Lauenensee (or Lake Lauenen) are two lakes near Lauenen in the Canton of Berne, Switzerland. At an elevation of 1381 m, their surface area is 0.1 km²: the larger lake has a surface of 8.8 ha, the smaller one of 1.3 ha.

The Swiss rock band Span published in 1982 the song "Louenesee" (Lake Lauenen in Berense German) about the lake.

See also
List of mountain lakes of Switzerland

External links
https://web.archive.org/web/20130608224709/http://lauenensee.com/ 

Lauenen
Bernese Oberland
Lakes of the canton of Bern
LLauenensee